Aghushkdal (also Romanized as Āghūshkdal; also known as Āgoshg and Āgoshk) is a village in Kangan Rural District, in the Central District of Jask County, Hormozgan Province, Iran. At the 2006 census, its population was 245, in 39 families.

References 

Populated places in Jask County